The LF-107 Luňák is a Czech aerobatic glider designed by Rudý Letov in the late 1940s. The design was developed within a prolific group of aeronautical engineers and sailplane pilots, including K. Dlouhý (later author of LET L-13 Blaník), J. Matejček, and B. Boček, led by chief designer Vladimír Štros.

Design and development

The first flight of the prototype took place on June 25, 1948, and a second prototype flew in July. The prototype participated later in the same year in aerobatic competition in Grenchen, Switzerland, and in Ziar, Poland in 1949, where its good aerobatic and gliding characteristics drew considerable attention.

Unfortunately, serial production was disrupted by geopolitical developments, as the factory was charged with production of MiG-15, MiG-19, MiG-21F aircraft, and access to Western civil export markets were progressively hampered by the emergence of the Iron Curtain. Therefore, only 75 examples of the Luňák were produced.

In 1950, a variant with simpler construction and a revised cockpit, among other changes, was developed. This LF-107 Luňák of wooden construction designated Letov VT-7 under the military training system was instrumental in the development of gliding and aerobatics in the Czech Republic. The LF-107 was also used for aerobatic training in the Soviet Union, Bulgaria, Romania and Poland.

XLF-207 Laminar
The Letov XLF-207 Laminar, a derivative of the Luňák, was the first glider in the world with a laminar flow wing. Its maiden flight took place in Praha Letnany in August 1951. Research into laminar flow wings was carried out by the XLF-207 Laminar, an LF-107 fitted with laminar flow wings. Presently there are only nine airworthy Luňáks, two of which are in the United Kingdom. A Luňák is displayed in the American Museum of Flight.

Variants

LF-107 Luňák
The initial production version of this aerobatic glider, 75 built.
VT-7
Simpler construction with a revised cockpit for use by the Czech military.
XLF-207 Laminar
The Letov XLF-207 Laminar was the first glider in the world with a laminar flow wing. Its maiden flight took place in Praha Letnany in August 1951.

Specifications (LF-107 Luňák)

See also

References

Further reading
German Wikipedia article :de:Letov LF 107 Luňák
Peter Mallinson and Mike Woollard, Handbook of Glider Aerobatics

External links

 German site dedicated to the Luňák
 Museum of Flight 
 Flying revue – LF 107 Luňák History (Czech) 

1940s Czechoslovakian sailplanes
LF-107
Mid-wing aircraft
Aircraft first flown in 1948